Vitaliy Anatoliyovych Gulyaev (26 May 1978 — 23 July 2022) was a Ukrainian military officer.  He served in the Armed Forces of Ukraine, rising to the rank of colonel, and serving as commander of the 28th Separate Mechanized Brigade between 2021 and 2022. 

He had been in combat action since the beginning of the war in eastern Ukraine in 2014, and died during the Russian invasion of Ukraine in 2022. He was posthumously appointed a Knight of the Order of Bohdan Khmelnytsky III degree in 2022.

Biography
Gulyaev was born in 1978 in the city of Shostka, Sumy Oblast. He joined the Armed Forces of Ukraine in 1995. He served at the front since the beginning of the war in eastern Ukraine in 2014.

In April 2019, Lieutenant Colonel Gulyaev congratulated personnel and presented certificates and commemorative badges of the motorized infantry battalion and other military ranks in Shostka, on the occasion of the celebration of the 5th anniversary of the battalion's creation.

Gulyaev then served in the 93rd Mechanized Brigade. Later, he held the position of chief of staff of the 28th Mechanized Brigade, and in September 2021 he was appointed commander of the 28th brigade.  He received a master's degree from Taras Shevchenko Luhansk National University in Starobilsk.  He was awarded the "Cold Ravine" award.

Since February 2022, with the beginning of the Russian military invasion of Ukraine, Vitaly Gulyaev at the head of the 28th Mechanized Brigade was on the front line, stopping the advance of Russian troops in the south of Ukraine.

Gulyaev died on 23 July 2022 on the outskirts of Mykolaiv as a result of a rocket attack on a command post. His funeral took place on 26 July 2022 at the Odesa Military Academy. The service also commemorated three lieutenant colonels; Oleksandr Deinek, Valentin Sergiyenko and Vitaly Bondarev, who died on 23 July together with the commander. The ceremony was attended by city and regional leaders, including the commander of the operational command "South" Major General Andriy Kovalchuk, the fifth president of Ukraine Petro Poroshenko, the former acting President of Ukraine Oleksandr Turchynov, and others.

Awards
Gulyaev was posthumously awarded the Order of Bohdan Khmelnytsky III degree on 4 August 2022, "for personal courage and selfless actions shown in the defense of the state sovereignty and territorial integrity of Ukraine, loyalty to the military oath."

Commemoration
The street received a new name in honor of the commander of the 28th separate mechanized brigade. 21 deputies voted for the idea of perpetuating the memory of Colonel Gulyaev, the decision was adopted unanimously. On 9 August 2022, the press service of the Yuzhne City Council reported that a public discussion had begun on renaming streets in two settlements after Vitaliy Gulyaev. On 18 August 2022, a street and alley in the city of Berezivka, Odesa Oblast, were renamed after Gulyaev.

References

1978 births
2022 deaths
Recipients of the Order of Bohdan Khmelnytsky, 3rd class
Ukrainian military personnel killed in the 2022 Russian invasion of Ukraine
People from Shostka